1870 Glaukos  is a mid-sized Jupiter trojan from the Trojan camp, approximately  in diameter. Discovered during the first Palomar–Leiden Trojan survey in 1971, it was later named for Glaucus from Greek mythology. The dark D-type asteroid has a rotation period of 6.0 hours.

Discovery 

Glaukos was discovered on 24 March 1971, by Dutch astronomer couple Ingrid and Cornelis van Houten at Leiden, on photographic plates taken by astronomer Tom Gehrels at the Californian Palomar Observatory in California. The body's observation arc begins with a precovery of its first recorded observation at Palomar in November 1955, or more than 15 years prior to its official discovery observation.

This discovery was made in the context of a larger survey of faint Trojans. The trio of Dutch and Dutch–American astronomers also collaborated on the productive Palomar–Leiden survey in the 1960s, using the same procedure as for this (smaller) survey: Tom Gehrels used Palomar's Samuel Oschin telescope (also known as the 48-inch Schmidt Telescope), and shipped the photographic plates to Cornelis and Ingrid van Houten at Leiden Observatory where astrometry was carried out.

More than 7000 Jupiter trojans have already been discovered.

Orbit and classification 

Glaukos is a dark Jovian asteroid in a 1:1 orbital resonance with Jupiter. It is located in the trailing Trojan camp at the Gas Giant's  Lagrangian point, 60° behind its orbit . It is also a non-family asteroid of the Jovian background population. It orbits the Sun at a distance of 5.1–5.4 AU once every 12.02 years (4,389 days; semi-major axis of 5.25 AU). Its orbit has an eccentricity of 0.03 and an inclination of 7° with respect to the ecliptic.

Physical characteristics 

Glaukos has been characterized as a dark D-type asteroid by PanSTARRS photometric survey as well as in the SDSS-based taxonomy. It is the most common spectral type among the Jupiter trojans.

Lightcurves 

In 2012 and 2013, three rotational lightcurves of Glaukos in the R- and S-band were obtained by astronomers at the Palomar Transient Factory in California. Lightcurve analysis gave a rotation period of 5.979, 5.980 and 5.989 hours with an amplitude between 0.27 and 0.37 magnitude.

In October 2013, photometric observations by American astronomer Robert Stephens at the Center for Solar System Studies gave the so-far best rated lightcurve, with a period of  hours and a brightness variation of 0.42 magnitude.

Diameter and albedo 

According to the survey carried out by NASA's Wide-field Infrared Survey Explorer with its subsequent NEOWISE mission, Glaukos measures 47.65 kilometers in diameter, and its surface has an albedo of 0.049, while the Collaborative Asteroid Lightcurve Link assumes a standard albedo for a carbonaceous asteroid of 0.057 and calculates a diameter of 42.23 kilometers with an absolute magnitude of 10.6.

Naming 

This minor planet was named after Glaucus (Glaukos) from Greek mythology. In Homer's Iliad, he was captain in the Lycian contingent during the Trojan War. and was killed by Ajax, after whom the Jovian asteroid 1404 Ajax is named. The official  was published by the Minor Planet Center on 1 June 1975.

Notes

References

External links 
 Asteroid Lightcurve Database (LCDB), query form (info )
 Dictionary of Minor Planet Names, Google books
 Discovery Circumstances: Numbered Minor Planets (1)-(5000) – Minor Planet Center
 
 

001870
Discoveries by Cornelis Johannes van Houten
Discoveries by Ingrid van Houten-Groeneveld
Discoveries by Tom Gehrels
Named minor planets
19710324